Sir Peter Tait  (5 September 1915 – 31 January 1996) was a New Zealand National Party Member of Parliament, mayor of Napier, small businessman and opponent of New Zealand's Homosexual Law Reform Act.

Early life

Tait was born on 5 September 1915, in Wellington's Island Bay suburb. His family were Scottish immigrants, originally from the Shetland Islands. His father Jack and his uncles Peter and Ross belonged to the best known Shetland fishing families in Island Bay. Through his early life, Tait suffered from tuberculosis, which meant that he was unable to play an active role in New Zealand's Second World War effort, nor could he become a Baptist minister.

He moved from Waipukurau, a rural community, to the East Coast of the North Island, and ultimately settled in Napier. Once established there, he opened a shoe store, which came to have branches in Waipukurau, Napier, Hastings and Dannevirke.

Political career

Member of Parliament

Tait served as the National Member of Parliament for Napier (1951–1954). In 1953, he was awarded the Queen Elizabeth II Coronation Medal.

Mayor of Napier
Two years after leaving Parliament, he became Mayor of Napier for the next eighteen years (1956–1974).

Later life and death
Tait was a Baptist, who helped to organise the Coalition of Concerned Citizens in the mid-eighties, and fought against homosexual law reform. Ultimately, though, the Homosexual Law Reform Act passed its final reading.

Tait then ran foul of his former colleagues in the 'Gang of Twenty' affair in 1989 when the contributory mortgage company he chaired, AdvisorCorp, found itself the target of attacks from National Party leader Jim Bolger. Bolger would later publicly apologise to Tait, but two of the principals in the company were successfully prosecuted and AdvisorCorp collapsed.

He funded the Tait Fountain in Napier, which commemorates Victory in Europe Day and was dedicated on 9 May 1995 on the 50th anniversary of the end of that war.

Tait was appointed an Officer of the Order of the British Empire in the 1967 New Year Honours and promoted to Knight Commander of the Order of the British Empire in the 1975 New Year Honours. He died in 1996.

References

Obituary: Peter Tait from Evening Post (Wellington) 2 October 1996
Laurie Guy: Worlds in Collision: The Gay Law Reform Debate in New Zealand: 1960-1985 Wellington: Victoria University Press: (2002) 

1915 births
1996 deaths
New Zealand National Party MPs
New Zealand activists
New Zealand Baptists
Mayors of Napier, New Zealand
New Zealand MPs for North Island electorates
Members of the New Zealand House of Representatives
Unsuccessful candidates in the 1954 New Zealand general election
New Zealand Knights Commander of the Order of the British Empire
New Zealand politicians awarded knighthoods
20th-century Baptists